Scelidomachus socotranus is a species of spider found on the island of Socotra in the Indian Ocean. It is the only member of its genus.

References 

Palpimanidae
Endemic fauna of Socotra
Monotypic Araneomorphae genera
Spiders of Asia